John Dempsey (born 2 April 1951) is an English footballer, who played as a full back in the Football League for Tranmere Rovers.

References

External links

Tranmere Rovers F.C. players
Skelmersdale United F.C. players
Association football fullbacks
English Football League players
1951 births
Living people
English footballers